John van Ruysbroeck, original Flemish name Jan van Ruusbroec (1293 or 1294 – 2 December 1381) was an Augustinian canon and one of the most important of the Flemish mystics. Some of his main literary works include The Kingdom of the Divine Lovers, The Twelve Beguines, The Spiritual Espousals, A Mirror of Eternal Blessedness, The Little Book of Enlightenment, and The Sparkling Stone. Some of his letters also survive, as well as several short sayings (recorded by some of his disciples, such as Jan van Leeuwen). He wrote in the Dutch vernacular, the language of the common people of the Low Countries, rather than in Latin, the language of the Catholic Church liturgy and official texts, in order to reach a wider audience.

Life

Until his ordination
John had a devout mother, who brought him up in the Catholic faith; of his father we know nothing. John's surname, Van Ruusbroec, is not a surname in the modern sense but a toponym that refers to his native hamlet - modern-day Ruisbroek near Brussels.

At the age of eleven he left his mother, departing without leave or warning, to place himself under the guidance and tuition of his uncle, Jan Hinckaert, a canon regular of St. Gudule's, Brussels. Hinckaert was living according to his Apostolic views with a fellow-canon, Frank van Coudenberg.  This uncle provided for Ruysbroeck's education with a view to the priesthood. In due course, Ruysbroeck was presented with a prebend in St. Gudule's, and ordained in 1318. His mother had followed him to Brussels, entered a Béguinage there, and died shortly before his ordination.

Priest in Brussels
From 1318 until 1343 Ruysbroeck served as a parish priest at St. Gudula. He continued to lead, together with his uncle Hinckaert and Van Coudenberg, a life of extreme austerity and retirement. At that time the Brethren of the Free Spirit were causing controversy in the Netherlands and one of them, a woman named Heilwige Bloemardinne, was particularly active in Brussels, propagating her beliefs chiefly by means of popular pamphlets. Ruysbroeck responded with pamphlets also written in the native tongue (Middle Dutch). Nothing of these treatises remains.  The controversy had a permanent effect on Ruysbroeck: his later writings bear constant reference, direct and indirect, to the heretical views expressed in these times, and he always wrote in the country's native language, chiefly with a view to counteract these writings which he viewed as heretical.

Priest in Groenendaal
The desire for a more retired life, and possibly also the persecution which followed Ruysbroeck's attack on Bloemardinne, induced Ruysbroeck, Jan Hinckaert (d. 1350) and Vrank van Coudenberg (d. 1386) to leave Brussels in 1343 for the hermitage of Groenendaal, in the neighbouring Sonian Forest, which was made over to them by John III, Duke of Brabant. The ruins of the monastery are still present in the forest of Soignes.

Many disciples joined the little company. It was then that it was found expedient to organize into a duly-authorized religious body. The hermitage was erected into a community of canons regular on 13 March 1349, and eventually it became the motherhouse of a congregation, which bore its name of Groenendaal. Francis van Coudenberg was appointed first provost, and John Ruysbroeck prior. Hinckaert refrained from making the canonical profession lest the discipline of the house should suffer from the exemptions required by the infirmities of his old age; he dwelt, therefore, in a cell outside the cloister and there a few years later died.

This period, from his religious profession (1349) to his death (1381), was the most active and fruitful of Ruysbroeck's career. During this time, his fame as a man of God, as a sublime contemplative and a skilled director of souls, spread beyond the bounds of Flanders and Brabant to Holland, Germany, and France. He had relations with the nearby Carthusian house at Herne, and also with several communities of Poor Clare Franciscans. We know that he had connections with the Friends of God in Strasbourg, and also that in about 1378 he was visited by Geert Groote, the founder of the Devotio Moderna. It is possible, though disputed, that John Tauler came to see him.

John died at Groenendaal, aged 82, on 2 December 1381.

Works
In total, Ruysbroeck wrote twelve books, seven epistles, two hymns and a prayer. All were written in Middle Dutch.

Around 1340, Ruysbroeck wrote his masterpiece, The Spiritual Espousals. The 36 surviving Dutch manuscripts, as well as translations into Latin and Middle High German, are evidence of the book's popularity. Some of the text was also translated into Middle English (via the Latin translation) as The Chastising of God's Children (which was later printed by Wynkyn de Worde). Around the same time, he also wrote a short treatise, The Sparkling Stone, which was also translated into Middle English.

Ruysbroeck's most famous writings were composed during his time in Groenendaal. His longest and most popular work (surviving today in 42 manuscripts), The Spiritual Tabernacle was begun in Brussels but finished at Groenendaal, presumably early on in his time there. Two brief works, The Christian Faith (an explanation of the Creed) and a treatise on The Four Temptations, also date from around the time of Ruysbroeck's arrival in Groenendaal.
His later works include four writings to Margareta van Meerbeke, a Franciscan nun of Brussels. These are The Seven Enclosures (c1346-50), the first of his seven surviving letters, The Seven Rungs (c1359-60), and A Mirror of Eternal Blessedness.

Around 1363 the Carthusians at Herne dispatched a deputation to Groenendaal presenting Ruysbroeck with questions on his first book, The Realm of Lovers. Ruysbroeck went to Herne to clarify his teaching, and afterwards put this in writing in his work The Little Book of Enlightenment.

Thought
The treatise The Seven Steps of the Ladder of Spiritual Love is the one that is currently most-readily available. Of the various treatises preserved, the best-known and the most characteristic is that entitled The Spiritual Espousals. It is divided into three books, treating respectively of the active, the interior, and the contemplative life.

Literally, Ruysbroeck wrote as the spirit moved him. He loved to wander and meditate in the solitude of the forest adjoining the cloister; he was accustomed to carry a tablet with him, and on this to jot down his thoughts as he felt inspired so to do. Late in life he was able to declare that he had never committed aught to writing save by the motion of the Holy Ghost.

In none of his treatises do we find anything like a complete or detailed account of his system; perhaps it would be correct to say that he himself was not conscious of elaborating any system. In his dogmatic writings he explains, illustrates, and enforces traditional teachings with remarkable force and lucidity. In his ascetic works, his favourite virtues are detachment, humility and charity; he loves to dwell on such themes as flight from the world, meditation upon the life of Christ, especially the passion, abandonment to the Divine Will, and an intense personal love of God.

In common with most of the German mystics, Ruysbroeck starts from divine matters before describing humanity. His work often then returns to discussing God, showing how the divine and the human are so closely united as to become one. He demonstrates inclinations towards Christian universalism in writing that "Man, having proceeded from God is destined to return, and become one with Him again." But here he is careful to clarify his position: "There where I assert that we are one in God, I must be understood in this sense that we are one in love, not in essence and nature." Despite this declaration, however, and other similar saving clauses scattered over his pages, some of Ruysbroeck's expressions are certainly rather unusual and startling. The sublimity of his subject-matter was such that it could scarcely be otherwise. His devoted friend, Geert Groote, a trained theologian, confessed to a feeling of uneasiness over certain of his phrases and passages, and begged him to change or modify them for the sake at least of the weak. Later on, Jean Gerson and then Bossuet both professed to find traces of unconscious pantheism in his works. As an offset, the enthusiastic commendations of his contemporaries should be mentioned. These were by mystics and scholars such as Groote, Johannes Tauler, Thomas à Kempis, John of Schoonhoven, and in subsequent times of the Franciscan Henry van Herp, the Carthusians Denis and Laurentius Surius, the Carmelite Thomas á Jesu, the Benedictine Louis de Blois, and the Jesuit Leonardus Lessius. Ernest Hello and especially Maurice Maeterlinck have done much to make his writings known. Ruysbroeck was a powerful influence in developing United Nations Secretary General Dag Hammarskjöld's conception of spiritual growth through selfless service to humanity, as expressed in his book of contemplations called Vägmärken ('Markings').

Ruysbroeck insisted that the soul finds God in its own depths, and noted three stages of progress in what he called the spiritual ladder of Christian attainment: (1) the active life, (2) the inward life, (3) the contemplative life. He did not teach the fusion of the self in God, but held that at the summit of the ascent the soul still preserves its identity. In the Kingdom of the Lovers of God he explains that those seeking wisdom must "flow forth on the waters to all the boundaries of the earth, that is, on compassion, pity and mercy shown to the needs of all men", must "fly in the air of the Rational faculty" and "refer all actions and virtues to the honour of God"; thence (through grace) they will find an "immense and boundless clearness" bestowed upon their mind. In relation to the contemplative life, he held that three attributes should be acquired: The first is spiritual freedom from worldly desires ("as empty of every outward work as if he did not work at all"), the second is a mind unencumbered with images ("inward silence"), and the third is a feeling of inward union with God ("even as a burning and glowing fire which can never more be quenched"). His works, of which the most important were De vera contemplatione ("On true contemplation") and De septem gradibus amoris ("On the seven steps of love"), were published in 1848 at Hanover; also Reflections from the Mirror of a Mystic (1906) and Die Zierde der geistlichen Hochzeit (1901).

Veneration and commemoration
After Ruysbroeck's death in 1381, his relics were carefully preserved and his memory honoured as that of a saint. After his death, stories called him the Ecstatic Doctor or Divine Doctor, and his views formed a link between the Friends of God and the Brethren of the Common Life, the ideas which may have helped to bring about the Reformation.

When Groenendaal Priory was suppressed by Joseph II in 1783, his relics were transferred to St. Gudule's, Brussels, where, however, they were lost during the French Revolution. Ruysbroeck was beatified on 9 December 1908 by Pope Pius X via cultus confirmation.

No authentic portrait of Ruysbroeck is known to exist; but the traditional picture represents him in the canonical habit, seated in the forest with his writing tablet on his knee, as he was in fact found one day by the brethren—rapt in ecstasy and enveloped in flames, which encircle without consuming the tree under which he is resting.

At the University of Antwerp there is a Ruusbroec Institute for the study of the history of spirituality. There is also a secondary school called Jan van Ruusbroeckollege in Laken near the Royal Palace of Belgium.

Cultural references 
The epigraph of the 1884 novel À rebours by Joris-Karl Huysmans has the following Ruysbroeck quotation: "I must rejoice beyond the bounds of time... though the world may shudder at my joy, and in its coarseness know not what I mean." In this novel, Huysmans describes Ruysbroeck as "un mystique du e siècle, dont la prose offrait un incompréhensible mais attirant amalgame d’exaltations ténébreuses, d’effusions caressantes, de transports âpres" ("a thirteenth century mystic whose prose presented an incomprehensible but attractive amalgam of gloomy ectasies, tender raptures, and violent rages.")

Ruysbroeck is mentioned in The Razor's Edge, a novel by W. Somerset Maugham.

See also
 List of Latin nicknames of the Middle Ages: Doctors in theology
 Evelyn Underhill's Ruysbroeck

References

Further reading

Modern editions
Jan van Ruusbroec: Opera Omnia, ed. G. de Baere, 10 vols, (Turnhout: Brepols, 1981-2006) [the modern critical edition, with the sixteenth-century Latin edition of Laurentius Surius alongside a facing English translation]
The Complete Ruusbroec, ed. G. de Baere and Th. Mertens, 2 vols, (Turnhout: Brepols, 2014) [slightly revised edition of the Middle Dutch text and English translation of the 1981-2006 edition]

Older translations:
The Spiritual Espousals. Trans. by H. Rolfson, intro. by P. Mommaers, edited by J. Alaerts. Collegeville, Minnesota: Liturgical Press, 1995.
John Ruusbroec. The Spiritual Espousals and other works. Introduction and translation by James A. Wiseman, O.S.B., preface by Louis Dupré. Mahwah, N.J.: Paulist Press, 1985. [Classics of Western Spirituality] {Includes also: The Sparkling Stone, A Mirror of Eternal Blessedness, and The Little Book of Clarification.} Pages: xvii, 286.
The Spiritual Espousals. Translation by Eric Colledge. (London: Faber and Faber, 1952) (Reprint 1983 by Christian Classics.)
The Seven Steps of the Ladder of Spiritual Love. Translated by F. Sherwood Taylor, introduced by Joseph Bolland, S.J. London: Dacre Press 1944. Pages: viii, 63.
The Kingdom of the Lovers of God. Trans. by T. Arnold Hyde. London: Kegan paul, Trench, Trubner, 1919. Pages: xvi, 216.
The Adornment of the Spiritual Marriage; The Sparkling Stone; The Book of the Supreme Truth. Translation by C. A. Wynschenk.  Introduction and Notes by Evelyn Underhill. London: J. M. Dent, 1916. {reprinted as (London: J.M. Watkins, 1951), and also in facsimile of the 1916 edition as (Felinfach: Llanerch, 1994)}
The Book of the Twelve Béguines. Trans. from Flemish by John Francis. London, 1913. {First sixteen chapters only.}
Reflections from the mirror of a mystic, trans. by E.Baillie. London: Thomas Baker, 1905. {Per E.Underhill: short passages paraphrased into Latin by Laurentius Surius (c.1552); however, the better version is Flowers of a Mystic Garden, transl. by 'C.E.S.' London: Watkins, 1912, which was reprinted as Flowers of a Mystic Garden, translated from the French of Ernest Hello by C.E.S., (Felinfach: Llanerch, 1994)}
see Paul Verdeyen below.

Commentary
Ruusbroec
Louis Dupré, The Common Life. Origins of Trinitarian Mysticism and Its Development by Jan van Ruusbroec. New York: Crossroad, 1984.
Paul Mommaers, The Land Within. The Process of Possessing & Being Possessed by God according to the Mystic Jan Van Ruysbroeck. Translated from the Dutch by David N. Smith. Chicago: Franciscan Herald Press, 1975.
Rik Van Nieuwenhove, Jan Van Ruusbroec. Mystical Theologian of the Trinity, University of Notre Dame, 2003.
Vincent Joseph Scully, A Mediaeval Mystic. A short account of the life and writings of Blessed John Rysbroeck, Canon regular of Groenendael A.D. 1293–1381.... New York: Benziger Brothers, 1911. Pages: xii, 131.
Wayne Teasdale, "Ruysbroeck's Mystical Theology" Parts 1 and 2. American Benedictine Review 35:82–96, 35:176–193 (1984).
Evelyn Underhill, Ruysbroeck. London: G. Bell, 1915. Reprint: Kessinger 2003. Pages: ii, 191. Online
Paul Verdeyen, Ruusbroec and his Mysticism, Collegeville: Liturgical Press/Michael Glazier, 1994, includes a short anthology of his writings; being Ruusbroec en zijn mystiek (Leuven: Davidfonds 1981) as transl. by Andre Lefevere.

Alfred Wautier d'Aygalliers, Ruysbroeck the Admirable. Transl. by Fred Rothwell. London: J. M. Dent & Sons, 1925, & E. P. Dutton, New York, 1925. Reprint: Port Washington, New York: Kennikat, 1969. Pages: xliii, 326.
Paul Mommaers and Norbert De Paepe (editors), Jan van Ruusbroec: The Sources, Content, and Sequels of his Mysticism.  Louvain: Leuven University Press, 1984.  [Mediaevalia Lovaniensia, ser.1, stud.12]

Ruusbroec in context
John Arblaster and Rob Faesen, A Companion to John of Ruusbroec. Leiden and Boston: Brill, 2014.
Stephanus Axters, The Spirituality of the Old Low Countries. London: Blackfriars 1954; being La spiritualité des Pays-Bas: l'evloution d'une doctrine mystique (Louvain 1948), transl. by Donald Attwater. {Axters focuses on Ruusbroec.}
Helmut Hatzfeld, "Influence of Ramon Lull & Jan van Ruysbroeck on the Language of Spanish Mystics"  Traditio 4: 337–397 (1946).
Bernard McGinn, The Varieties of Vernacular Mysticism 1350-1550 (New York: Herder & Herder 2012), chapters one and two.
Paul Mommaers & Jan van Bragt, Mysticism, Buddhist and Christian. Encounters with Jan van Ruusbroec. New York: Crossroad, 1995. [Nanzan studies in religion and culture (Nagoya)]

External links

 Article from the New Schaff-Herzog Encyclopedia of Religious Knowledge (unedited OCR scan; scroll to bottom of page for start of article)
 Translations of "The Adornment of the Spiritual Marriage", "The Sparkling Stone", and "The Book of the Supreme Truth"
 Translation of "The Book of the Supreme Truth"
 Translation of "The Adornment of the Spiritual Marriage"
Essay on the 'Friends of God'
Amherst Manuscript Transcription, 'The Sparkling Stone'

Translation of the last chapter of the "Spiritual Espousals"
 John Ruysbroeck, Blessed at The Original Catholic Encyclopedia

1290s births
1381 deaths
14th-century venerated Christians
Belgian beatified people
Flemish Christian mystics
Flemish writers (before 1830)
Middle Dutch writers
People from Sint-Pieters-Leeuw
14th-century people of the Holy Roman Empire
People from the Duchy of Brabant
Beatifications by Pope Pius X